Washington is the twelfth richest state in the United States of America, with a per capita income of $22,973 (2000) and a personal per capita income of $33,332 (2003).

Washington counties ranked by per capita income

Note: Data is from the 2010 United States Census Data and the 2006-2010 American Community Survey 5-Year Estimates.

References

Washington
Economy of Washington (state)
Income